Agaone is a genus of beetles in the family Cerambycidae, containing the following species:

 Agaone amazonica Bezark, Santos-Silva & Martins, 2011
 Agaone bicolor (Linsley, 1934)
 Agaone notabilis (White, 1855)
 Agaone peruviensis (Fisher, 1952)
 Agaone punctilla Martins & Santos-Silva, 2010

References

Rhinotragini